Suheyel Najar (born 13 October 1995) is a German professional footballer who plays as a midfielder for SV Wehen Wiesbaden.

Career
Najar made his professional debut for Viktoria Köln in the 3. Liga on 20 July 2019, coming on as a substitute in the 85th minute for Albert Bunjaku in the 3–3 away draw against Hansa Rostock.

References

External links
 
 

1995 births
Living people
Sportspeople from Cologne
German footballers
Tunisian footballers
German people of Tunisian descent
Association football midfielders
3. Liga players
Regionalliga players
FC Hennef 05 players
Bonner SC players
FC Viktoria Köln players
SC Fortuna Köln players
SV Wehen Wiesbaden players